Dadamraz (also Romanized as Dādamraz; also known as Dādamras) is a village in Bazarjan Rural District, in the Central District of Tafresh County, Markazi Province, Iran. At the 2006 census, its population was 143, in 53 families.

References 

Populated places in Tafresh County